Crute is a surname meaning "lump" or "dullard". Notable people with the surname include:
 Austin Crute (born 1995), American actor and singer
 Jimmy Crute (born 1996), Australian mixed martial artist
 Sally Crute (1886–1971), American silent actress

References

English-language surnames